The 1990 United States Senate elections were held on Tuesday, November 6, 1990, with the 33 seats of Class 2 contested in regular elections. Special elections were also held to fill vacancies. The Democratic Party increased its majority with a net gain of one seat from the Republican Party. The election took place in the middle of President George H. W. Bush's term, and, as with most other midterm elections, the party not holding the presidency gained seats in Congress.

These elections featured the smallest seat change in history since the passage of the Seventeenth Amendment in 1913 with only one seat changing parties, and this would happen again in 2022. That election featured Democrat Paul Wellstone defeating incumbent Republican Rudy Boschwitz in Minnesota. To date, this is the last cycle in which Democratic candidates won U.S. Senate elections in Oklahoma and Tennessee.

Results summary

Source: Clerk of the United States House of Representatives

Gains, losses, and holds

Retirements
Three Republicans retired instead of seeking re-election.

Defeats
One Republican sought re-election but lost in the general election.

Change in composition

Before the elections

Result of the elections

Complete list of races

Special elections 
In these special elections, the winners were elected in 1990.

Elections are sorted by date, then state and class.

Elections leading to the next Congress 
In these general elections, the winners were elected for the term beginning January 3, 1991; ordered by state.

All of the elections involved the Class 2 seats.

Closest races 

In eight races the margin of victory was under 10%.

Michigan was the tipping point state with a margin of 16.3%.

Alabama 

Incumbent Democrat Howell Heflin won re-election to a third term over Republican Bill Cabaniss, State Senator and former State Representative. This is the last time the Democrats have won the Class 2 Senate Seat from Alabama until Doug Jones won the seat in 2017.

Alaska 

Incumbent Republican United States Senator Ted Stevens sought re-election to a fifth term in the United States Senate, which he won easily, besting his opponents in a landslide.

Arkansas 

Incumbent Democrat David Pryor won re-election uncontested.

Colorado 

Incumbent Republican senator William L. Armstrong did not seek re-election to another term. Republican congressman Hank Brown won the open seat, defeating Democratic nominee Josie Heath, former Boulder County Commissioner

Delaware 

Incumbent Democrat Joe Biden won re-election to a fourth term, defeating Republican challenger M. Jane Brady, Deputy Attorney General of Delaware.

Georgia 

Incumbent Democrat Sam Nunn won re-election to a fourth term uncontested.

Hawaii (special) 

Incumbent Democrat Daniel Akaka was elected to finish the term ending in 1995 over Republican U.S. Representative Pat Saiki. Akaka had been appointed by Governor John Waihee in April 1990 to serve temporarily after the death of Spark Matsunaga.

Idaho 

Republican Rep. Larry Craig defeated Democratic former state legislator Ron Twilegar for the seat of U.S. Senator Jim McClure, who did not seek re-election.

Illinois 

Incumbent Democrat Paul Simon sought re-election to the United States Senate. Simon was opposed by Republican nominee Lynn Morley Martin, a United States Congresswoman from Illinois's 16th congressional district, whom he easily defeated to win a second and final term in the Senate.

Indiana (special) 

Incumbent Republican Dan Coats, who was recently appointed to this seat two years prior, won election to serve out the remainder of the term, beating Democratic State Representative Baron Hill.

During the 1988 presidential election, Republican nominee Vice President George H. W. Bush selected U.S. Senator Dan Quayle of Indiana as his vice presidential nominee. The Bush-Quayle ticket defeated the Dukakis-Bentsen ticket in the general election by a 53%-46% margin, capturing 40 states and 426 electoral votes.

In preparation for the pending vacancy, Governor Robert D. Orr appointed four-term U.S. Representative Dan Coats to fill Quayle's seat on December 12, 1988. Coats was a former aide to Quayle, whom he had succeeded as U.S. Representative for Indiana's 4th congressional district in 1981. Quayle eventually resigned his Senate seat on January 3, 1989, and Coats was immediately sworn into office.

Coats used television commercials that raised questions about Hill's consistency in opposing new taxes, and Hill gained notoriety for walking the length of the state to meet voters.

Iowa 

Incumbent Democrat Tom Harkin sought re-election to a second term in the United States Senate. Harkin was opposed by Republican United States Congressman Tom Tauke, from Iowa's 2nd congressional district, and both Harkin and Tauke won their primaries uncontested. Though Harkin performed slightly worse than he had six years earlier, he was successful in his re-election bid and defeated Tauke.

Kansas 

Incumbent Republican Nancy Kassebaum won re-election her third full term, over Democrat Dick Williams, an educator at Wichita State University

Kentucky 

Incumbent Republican Mitch McConnell won re-election to a second term over Democrat Harvey Sloane, former Mayor of Louisville

Louisiana 

Incumbent Democrat J. Bennett Johnston Jr. won re-election to a fourth term and avoided a runoff, beating Republican David Duke, State Representative and former Grand Wizard of the Ku Klux Klan.

This election was viewed at the onset as potentially competitive, as Senator Johnston was viewed as vulnerable in light of Louisiana's economic troubles at the time and Senator Johnston's voting record viewed by Republicans as too liberal. The Republican Party leadership endorsed the candidacy of State Senator Ben Bagert, who was picked over Secretary of State Fox McKeithen, State Representative Quentin Dastugue and State Representative David Duke. David Duke, however, continued his candidacy and slowly overtook Bagert in attention and in the polls. Duke attracted national attention to the race with his involvement with white supremacist groups and his appeals to white resentment over affirmative-action programs. With Bagert failing to gain traction, the National Republican Senatorial Committee tried to recruit former Governor David Treen to jump into the race. When Treen passed, the effort turned from supporting Bagert to stopping Duke.

As the election drew near, polls showed Johnston firmly in first place, with Duke in second place and Bagert trailing far behind at third. National Republicans grew fearful that Bagert's candidacy would only serve to force a runoff and that a potential runoff election with Duke being the de facto Republican nominee would hurt the national brand. On October 4, eight Republican Senators endorsed Johnston, with Senator John Danforth saying at the press conference that "all of us would be embarrassed and mortified to have to serve in the United States Senate with David Duke masquerading as a Republican." Bagert dropped out of the race the next day, announcing that "it became more and more apparent, that instead of forcing a runoff between myself and Bennett Johnston, I might very well be forcing a runoff between somebody else and Bennett Johnston." He announced he would "reluctantly" vote for Johnston. Bagert's name remained on the ballot, but under state law his votes could not be counted as part of the official tally. After Bagert dropped out, HUD Secretary Jack Kemp endorsed Johnston, saying "there's no place in the Republican Party for someone who has practiced and practices racism, bigotry and anti-Semitism."

Maine 

Incumbent Republican William Cohen won re-election to a third term over Democratic State Representative Neil Rolde.

Massachusetts 

Incumbent Democratic U.S. Senator John Kerry was re-elected to his second term over Republican real estate developer Jim Rappaport.

Michigan 

Incumbent Democrat Carl Levin won re-election to a third term, beating Republican U.S. Representative Bill Schuette.

Minnesota 

Incumbent Republican Rudy Boschwitz was defeated by Democratic challenger Paul Wellstone in a tight race. Widely considered an underdog and outspent by a 7-to-1 margin, Wellstone, a professor at Carleton College and nominee for Minnesota State Auditor in 1982 was the only candidate to defeat an incumbent senator in the 1990 election cycle and gained national attention after his upset victory.

Mississippi 

Incumbent Republican Thad Cochran won re-election to a third term.

Montana 

Incumbent United States Senator Max Baucus, who was first elected in 1978 and was re-elected in 1984, ran for re-election. After winning the Democratic primary, he moved on to the general election, where he was opposed by Allen Kolstad, the Lieutenant Governor of Montana and the Republican nominee. Baucus ultimately ended up defeating Kolstad in a landslide, winning his third term with ease.

Nebraska 

Incumbent Democrat J. James Exon won re-election to a third term, beating Republican U.S. Representative Hal Daub.

New Hampshire 

Incumbent Republican Gordon J. Humphrey decided to retire and not run for re-election to a third term. Republican Bob Smith won the open seat, beating Democratic former Senator John A. Durkin.

New Jersey 

Democratic Senator Bill Bradley decided to seek re-election and narrowly edged out little-known Republican Christine Todd Whitman, President of the New Jersey Board of Public Utilities.

Senator Bill Bradley didn't realize he was in trouble of winning re-election and the New Jersey voters' anger over taxes and economy until the week prior to the election.

The senator had a major image problem. In the early part of the campaign Bradley was winning easily in the polls, so his staffers told him to play it safe. He sent out television advertisements of himself walking on the beach, shooting a perfect shot on the court, and sitting back in his office with his basketball shoes onto his desk. The advertisements backfired as voters were turned off and thought that he hadn't taken his job as Senator seriously, at a time when New Jersey voters were suffering.

Another major problem with Bradley was how Democratic Governor Jim Florio implemented a $2.8 billion tax increase, hurting the state's economy. In addition, Bradley refused to answer questions pertaining to Florio's tax policies.

After Bradley realized he was in trouble he released negative advertisements. They attacked Whitman's own record on taxes, accusing her of favoring tax increases when she was a Somerset County Freeholder. Bradley's image may have been further damaged by his newer advertisements.

New Mexico 

Incumbent Republican Pete Domenici won re-election to a fourth term over Democratic State Senator Tom Benavidez.

North Carolina 

The election was fought between the Republican incumbent Jesse Helms and the Democratic nominee Mayor of Charlotte Harvey Gantt. Helms won re-election to a fourth term by a slightly wider margin than the close election in 1984.

Helms drew controversy for airing what became known as the "Hands" ad produced by Alex Castellanos. It showed a pair of white hands with the voiceover saying "You needed that job, and you were the best qualified. But they had to give it to a minority because of a racial quota." The ad prompted allegations of racism.

Oklahoma 

Incumbent Democrat David Boren won re-election to a third term over Republican attorney Stephen Jones.

Oregon 

Republican Mark Hatfield was re-elected to a fifth term, defeating Democratic businessman Harry Lonsdale.

The front-runners emerged quickly: for the Republicans, Hatfield was in his fourth term and was the 8th most senior U.S. Senator, having previously served as Governor of Oregon for two terms and Oregon Secretary of State. For the Democrats, Harry Lonsdale, who had founded the biotechnology company Bend Research, announced in early 1990 that he intended to aggressively challenge Hatfield over the incumbent's ties to special interests, and his positions on abortion rights and timber management.

In the Republican primary, Hatfield received a token challenge from Randy Prince, an environmentalist and former Eugene mayoral candidate who had once protested old-growth forest logging by tree sitting for 40 days. Despite an early miscue by Hatfield in which he missed the deadline for submitting a photograph for the primary voter's guide, Hatfield handily defeated Prince to move on to the general election.

U.S. Congressman Ron Wyden considered challenging Hatfield, but decided against it. Lonsdale, who was unknown as a politician, announced his campaign in March, and came out swinging directly at Hatfield and mostly ignored his primary challengers. Lonsdale's main campaign themes were abortion rights, which Hatfield opposed; and timber management, in which Lonsdale opposed exporting timber from Oregon forests and wanted to restrict logging in old-growth forests. Lonsdale also criticized Hatfield as being out-of-touch with Oregonians after so many years in the Senate. Lonsdale announced that he would refuse to take special-interest contributions in his campaign, and would finance the campaign himself with the millions he had made from Bend Research. Lonsdale easily defeated his competition: Salem attorney Steve Anderson, Pleasant Hill computer programmer Neale S. Hyatt, Milwaukie retired truck driver Brooks Washburne, Eugene activist Bob Reuschlein, and Frank A. Clough, also of Eugene.

Once the primaries concluded, Hatfield, who had been first elected U.S. Senator in 1966, rolled out his usual campaign honed from his decades of experience: he refused debates, never engaged his opponent directly, and focused on small, friendly campaign appearances that stressed the influence he wielded as a U.S. Senator with seniority and influence.

Lonsdale's self-financed campaign made heavy use of TV attack ads, criticizing Hatfield as being out of step with Oregonians on every issue, but primarily in terms of timber and abortion. He also made use of a nationwide anti-incumbency sentiment, and tore into Hatfield for being too closely tied to Washington special interests, and attempted to tie Hatfield to the Savings and loan crisis of the mid-1980s through his advisor Gerry Frank of the Meier & Frank chain of Oregon department stores, who had ties to a Salem savings and loan. By early October, polls showed the gap closing from 25 down to about 4 points in an early October poll conducted by The Oregonian newspaper, and by the end of October, some polls showed Lonsdale in the lead.

With the polls running against him and time running out, Hatfield, who had not been seriously challenged since first being elected in 1966 and had never lost an election, abandoned his tactic of staying above the fray and not engaging Lonsdale directly. In the media and in television ads, he charged Lonsdale with hypocrisy in his environmental stand, alleging that Lonsdale had allowed his company to illegally dump toxic chemicals into the environment. Lonsdale vigorously denied the charges, which were later shown to have violated no laws, but the tactic may have stalled Lonsdale's momentum. Hatfield went on to win in all but Multnomah, Jackson, Baker, and Lincoln counties to win by more than 7 percentage points statewide.

Rhode Island 

Democratic Incumbent Claiborne Pell defeated Republican Representative Claudine Schneider in a landslide.

South Carolina 

Popular incumbent Republican Strom Thurmond cruised to re-election against Democratic challenger and perennial candidate Bob Cunningham.

Senator Strom Thurmond faced no opposition from South Carolina Republicans and avoided a primary election. The state Democrats saw this as an unwinnable race so when Bob Cunningham sought the Democratic nomination, he was unopposed in his bid.

Cunningham launched his second bid to unseat Republican Sen. Strom Thurmond after switching from the GOP to the Democratic Party in early 1990. Though he faced a formidable opponent, Cunningham planned no fund-raising activities. "I don't plan to ask for anything and I won't accept any money from PACs," he said. Cunninghman said his campaign strategy was to "go to places where I was invited and spread out my ideas." If elected, Cummingham said he would push to limit consecutive congressional service to 12 years and reform the tax system. He supported greater environmental activism. "I think we're going at it in much too lukewarm a fashion. I think we should work hard to find a substitute for the internal combustion engine."

The election was never a serious contest. Thurmond overwhelmingly outspent Cunningham in his re-election campaign.

South Dakota 

Incumbent Republican Larry Pressler won a narrow re-election battle against Democratic opponent Ted Muenster and Independent candidate Dean Sinclair, in contrast to his easy win in 1984.

Tennessee 

Democratic Senator Al Gore won re-election to a second term over Republican William R. Hawkins, a conservative author. As of 2016, this is the last Senate election in Tennessee that was won by a Democrat and the last time they won the state's Class 2 Senate Seat.

Texas 

Incumbent Republican Phil Gramm won re-election to a second term, beating Hugh Parmer, State Senator and former Mayor of Fort Worth

Gramm, a popular incumbent who switched parties a few years prior, had over $5 million on hand.

Virginia 

Incumbent Republican John W. Warner won re-election to a third term. No Democrat filed to run against him as he won every single county and city in the state with over 60% of the vote. Independent Nancy B. Spannaus (an affiliate of the controversial Lyndon LaRouche) got 18% of the vote, as she was the only other candidate on the ballot besides Warner.

West Virginia 

The 1990 United States Senate election in West Virginia was held November 6, 1990. Incumbent Democratic U.S. Senator Jay Rockefeller won re-election to a second term.

Wyoming 

Incumbent Republican Alan Simpson easily won re-election to a third term over Democratic challenger Kathy Helling.

See also
 1990 United States elections
 1990 United States gubernatorial elections
 1990 United States House of Representatives elections
 101st United States Congress
 102nd United States Congress

Notes

References